"Freeway of Love" is a song by American singer Aretha Franklin. It was written by Jeffrey Cohen and Narada Michael Walden and produced by the latter for Franklin's thirtieth studio album Who's Zoomin' Who? (1985). The song features a notable contribution from Clarence Clemons, the saxophonist from Bruce Springsteen’'s E Street Band. Sylvester, Martha Wash, and Jeanie Tracy provided backup vocals on "Freeway of Love".

Released as the album's lead single on June 5, 1985, by Arista Records, the song became Franklin's highest-charting single in twelve years. It reached number three on the Billboard Hot 100 chart, while topping the Hot Black Singles chart for five weeks from July 27, to August 24, 1985 (her milestone twentieth number-one hit on the chart). In a remixed "rock" version, the song also topped the Hot Dance Music/Club Play chart. The accompanying promotional music video was filmed entirely in the Detroit, Michigan area, and became one of the most popular videos of the year. "Freeway of Love" earned Franklin her 12th Grammy Award for Best Female R&B Vocal Performance.

Owing to the pink Cadillac appearing on the cover art and several times in the lyrics, more than 100 pink Cadillacs accompanied Franklin in her funeral procession in August 2018.

Music video
The video was filmed primarily in black and white. It was filmed at Club Tattoo on Woodbridge Avenue (which Franklin co-owned) and is mostly a performance video. Franklin's "Another Night" music video was also filmed there. "Freeway of Love" is interspersed with videos of automobiles being manufactured in the early 1970s (Ford Mustang) and a then-current Cadillac Cimarron, as well as dancers in and around cars, sky shots of freeways, the Detroit skyline, and other ephemeral visuals. Portions of the "Freeway of Love" video were also filmed at Doug's Body Shop, located at 22061 Woodward Avenue, in Ferndale, Michigan. Clarence Clemons is featured in the video, and performs saxophone on the song..

Although the video is set to the original version of the song, the tempo of the song is noticeably faster in the video.

Track listing
US 7" Single

Personnel
 Aretha Franklin: lead vocals
 Narada Michael Walden: drums and percussion
 Randy "The King" Jackson: synth bass
 Walter "Baby Love" Afanasieff: keyboards
 Preston "Tiger Head" Glass: keyboards and keyboard vibes, backing vocals
 Corrado Rustici: guitar
 Greg "Gigi" Gonaway: tambourine
 The Santana Rhythm Section: percussion
 Clarence Clemons: saxophone, guest appearance (courtesy of Columbia Records)
 Karen "Kitty Beethoven" Brewington, Carolyn Franklin, Jim Gilstrap, Sylvester, Vicki Randle, Jeanie Tracy, Martha Wash, Laundon Von Hendricks: backing vocals
 Mingo Lewis: congas, percussion

Charts

Weekly charts

Year-end charts

Cover versions
In 1986, "Weird Al" Yankovic covered the song as part of his polka medley "Polka Party!".
The song was covered in 2009 by house music/dance singer Pepper Mashay.
A version by jazz musician Lea DeLaria appears in and on the soundtrack of the 2017 Pixar movie Cars 3.

References

1985 singles
1985 songs
Aretha Franklin songs
Arista Records singles
Black-and-white music videos
Cadillac
Dance-pop songs
Synth-pop songs
Songs written by Narada Michael Walden
Songs written by Jeffrey E. Cohen